Chiananda is a settlement in the Eastern Province of Kenya.

References 

Populated places in Eastern Province (Kenya)